Louis E. Newman is the John M. and Elizabeth W. Musser Professor of Religious Studies, emeritus at Carleton College in Northfield, Minnesota and Associate Vice Provost and Director of Undergraduate Advising and Research at Stanford University.

Newman grew up in St. Paul, Minnesota. He received his B.A. in philosophy and Hebrew and his M.A. in philosophy from the University of Minnesota. He received his Ph.D. in Judaic Studies from Brown University in 1983. He was a professor at Carleton College from 1983 to 2016 before joining Stanford University as Associate Vice Provost and Director of Undergraduate Advising and Research.

Newman has been described by Rabbi Eugene Borowitz as "probably our leading contemporary critic of applied Jewish ethical method."

Newman is the author of numerous books including:
Past Imperatives: Studies in the History and Theory of Jewish Ethics (SUNY Press, 1998)
An Introduction to Jewish Ethics (Prentice Hall, 2005)
Repentance: the Meaning and Practice of Teshuvah (Jewish Lights, 2010)

Newman was the founding President of the Society of Jewish Ethics.

He also served as president of Beth Jacob Congregation in Mendota Heights, Minnesota from June 2009-June 2011.

He is married to Amy Eilberg, the first woman to be ordained as a rabbi in Conservative Judaism.

References

External links 

 Stanford Faculty Page
 http://louisnewman.net/

Living people
Judaic studies
American religion academics
Carleton College faculty
Year of birth missing (living people)
Jewish American writers
Historians of Jews and Judaism
American historians of religion
Brown University alumni
University of Minnesota College of Liberal Arts alumni
Jewish ethicists
21st-century American Jews